Abdelkahar Kadri (born 24 June 2000) is an Algerian professional footballer who plays for Kortrijk in the Belgian First Division A.

Club career
On 12 August 2021, Kadri joined Belgian club Kortrijk from Paradou AC, signing a four-year contract.

International career
Kadri was called up to the Algeria national team in May 2022.
He debutes his national career in a friendly match against Iran which is ended 2-1 for Algeria on June 12th,2022.

References

External links
 

Living people
2000 births
Algerian footballers
Association football midfielders
K.V. Kortrijk players
Paradou AC players
Algerian Ligue Professionnelle 1 players
Belgian Pro League players
Algerian expatriate footballers
Algerian expatriate sportspeople in Belgium
Expatriate footballers in Belgium
People from Algiers Province
21st-century Algerian people